Ricardo Romero may refer to:

 Ricardo Romero (fencer) (1899–?), Chilean Olympic fencer
 Ricardo Romero (fighter) (born 1978), American mixed martial arts fighter
 Ricky Romero (Ricardo Romero, Jr., born 1984), American baseball player
 Ricardo Romero (writer) (born 1976), Argentine writer